Collooney railway station  serves the town of Collooney in County Sligo,  Ireland and is on the Dublin-Sligo railway line. It was the first of three stations to be built in Collooney and remains the only one still in service.

History
Collooney once had three railway stations. The current station was opened by the Midland Great Western Railway (MGWR) on 3 December 1862 as part of the extension of its line from Longford to Sligo. On 1 September 1881 the Sligo, Leitrim and Northern Counties Railway (SL&NCR) opened its station to the east, before building a connection to the MGWR at Carrignagat Junction to the north and thus completing its line from Enniskillen to Sligo. Finally, on 1 October 1895, the Great Southern and Western Railway (GS&WR) opened its station to the west, as part of the extension of its line from Claremorris to Sligo.

Following the creation of the Irish Free State, the MGWR and the GS&WR became part of the Great Southern Railways (GSR) in 1925. In turn, the GSR became part of Córas Iompair Éireann (CIÉ) in 1945.

On 1 October 1957, the SL&NCR's Collooney station closed along with the company. The line to Enniskillen was lifted shortly afterward. The GS&WR station closed on 17 June 1963 when CIÉ withdrew passenger services between Claremorris and Sligo; this line remained open for goods traffic until 1975, after which it fell into dereliction (though it is proposed to re-open in the future as part of the Western Railway Corridor).

Services
Today, the MGWR station is served by trains on the Dublin Connolly–Sligo InterCity service. It is unstaffed.

See also
 List of railway stations in Ireland

References

External links
Irish Rail Collooney station website

Iarnród Éireann stations in County Sligo
Railway stations in County Sligo
Railway stations opened in 1862
Collooney
1862 establishments in Ireland
Railway stations in the Republic of Ireland opened in the 19th century